Emoticon ;) is a 2014 film directed, co-written and starring Livia De Paolis.

Plot
A woman and her boyfriend's children become guides in each other's relationships.

References

External links

2014 films
2014 drama films
2010s English-language films
American drama films